Hosting the region's largest urban population, Halifax, Nova Scotia is an important cultural centre in Atlantic Canada. Halifax is home to a vibrant arts and culture community that enjoys considerable support and participation from the general population. As the largest community and the administrative centre of the Atlantic region since its founding in 1749, Halifax has long-standing tradition of being a cultural generator. While provincial arts and culture policies have tended to distribute investment and support of the arts throughout the province, sometimes to the detriment of more populous Halifax, cultural production in the region is increasingly being recognized for its economic benefits, as well as its purely cultural aspects.

The Halifax Regional Municipality is in the process of drafting a Cultural Plan to guide the municipality's arts and culture development.

While Halifax is not as multiculturally diverse as its larger Canadian counterparts, this is slowly evolving, particularly as the municipality and province place more emphasis on attracting immigrants. Muslims comprise the second-largest visible minority in Halifax, while the largest visible minority – the historic African Nova Scotian community – as well as the more recently established Greek and Lebanese communities provide important influences for local culture. The city benefits from a large population of post-secondary students, including a significant proportion of national and international students, who strongly influence the local cultural scene.

Performing arts
Halifax has been the home to live music and theatrical productions virtually since its founding. Writer-historian Thomas H. Raddall wrote that by the 1780s there were no less than two theatres, the "old" Grand Theatre on Argyle Street and the "new" Grand Theatre on Grafton Street. "The plays were mostly farces of the sort popular in London at the time…" (note Raddall). From 1876 until its demolition in 1929, plays, concerts and even operas were performed at the Academy of Music building near the corner of Barrington Street at Spring Garden Road. Reflecting the change in popular taste, the Academy building was torn down to make way for the Capitol Theatre, a movie house. The old-style cinema was itself subject to obsolescence, and in the 1970s demolished to make way for an office building (the Maritime Centre).

Theatre
Halifax is home to a number of theatre groups, the most prominent being the Neptune Theatre. Though Neptune was founded in 1963, live theatre had been performed on the present site since 1915 when it was reputed to be the first Vaudeville house designed and built specifically as a theatre.

Other notable theatre groups include the open air Shakespeare by the Sea, Eastern Front Theatre, based in Alderney Landing and Canada's longest continuously running community theatre The Theatre Arts Guild. There are several smaller theatre companies, such as OneLight Theatre, Zuppa Circus, Foghorn Theatre and 2b Theatre; as well as various community-based theatre groups including the Chester Players and the Dartmouth Players.

There is a theatre studies program at Dalhousie University and its Rebecca Cohn Auditorium is the largest performance theatre for dramatic and musical events in Halifax

Dance
Halifax is the home of several dance organizations, the oldest and largest is the Halifax Dance Association. Founded in 1973, Halifax Dance has over 1400 members and is the largest dance organization in the Atlantic region, located in the Maritime Centre on Barrington Street. Halifax Dance offers recreational classes in ballet, modern, jazz, creative movement, tap, hip-hop and physical theatre. It also offers the Intensive Training Program (ITP) for more serious study of dance, choreography and performance. Halifax Dance has several companies-in-residence: Senior Company-in Residence, Gwen Noah Dance, the modern companies Mocean Dance and Verve Mwendo and also the Young Company which tours Nova Scotian schools and annually presents The Nutcracker.

The other major dance organization in Halifax is the School of Dance at the Maritime Conservatory of Performing Arts.

Halifax's immigrant communities also have an array of dance troupes that perform all over Halifax and Nova Scotia. One of these troupes is Romiosyni Dance Group (Greek Community of Halifax) which headlines at the annual Greek Festival and performs throughout the Maritimes. The group is composed of volunteer instructors and dancers who share the love of Greek dance and culture. Their costume collection comes from the various regions of Greece and their repertoire includes a large number of traditional Greek dances.

Music

The musical scene in Halifax is broad and richly varied, from European classical to Celtic and Acadian traditional to the various forms of indie. It is the home of Symphony Nova Scotia, which dates back to 1897 when it was known as The Halifax Symphony. Many of its musicians have joint teaching appointments at the Dalhousie University School of Music and the Maritime Conservatory of Performing Arts. Symphony Nova Scotia's conductor since 2002 has been Bernhard Gueller.

Halifax is home to a vibrant music community.  Some notable artists to have emerged from Halifax include Buck 65, Universal Soul, Classified, Wintersleep, April Wine, and The Joel Plaskett Emergency. During the 1990s, Halifax was excitedly billed as the next Seattle because of its vibrant indie rock scene. Although it never managed to achieve Seattle's musical fame, a number of artists did emerge, including Sloan, Thrush Hermit, and Sarah McLachlan. Halifax is the home of the Halifax Pop Explosion, an indie rock festival that draws upwards of 20,000 attendees annually and showcases new and emerging music. Past performers include Arcade Fire, K'naan, The Hold Steady, Pains of Being Pure at Heart and hundreds more.

It also hosted the 2006 Juno Awards.

The city is occasionally included in the tours of top-grossing concert acts. The Rolling Stones recently held the largest concert the city has ever witnessed on September 23, 2006, on the Halifax Commons.

Visual arts

Halifax is a centre for the visual arts, being home to a celebrated school for art and design as well as more than 30 art galleries.

The Nova Scotia College of Art and Design, since its founding in 1887 as the Victoria School of Art and Design, has had a major influence on the visual arts in Nova Scotia, particularly in urban Halifax. Many NSCAD graduates have remained in Halifax and practiced as graphic designers, photographers, film-makers, muralists, ceramicists, jewellers and weavers.

Halifax has a multitude of galleries, both public and private, including the Art Gallery of Nova Scotia, housed in a  facility with a permanent collection of more than 15,000 items. Private galleries include Zwickers Gallery, Eye Level Gallery and Studio 21. There are numerous works of public art on display in the city.

As well, the local universities operate art galleries. NSCAD has its own exhibition space, the Anna Leonowens Gallery in Historic Properties. The Dalhousie Arts Centre houses the Dalhousie Art Gallery. Mount Saint Vincent University has hosted the MSVU Gallery since 1971. The Saint Mary's University art gallery bills itself as the first university art gallery in the city.

Film
Halifax has become a film-making centre, with many American and Canadian filmmakers using the city's streetscapes, often to stand in for other cities that are more expensive to work in. The city's port status also makes it a popular location for films about ships; scenes from the films Titanic (1997), The Shipping News, and K-19: The Widowmaker were all filmed in the region, as well as numerous silver-screen movies and various documentaries.

The Atlantic Filmmakers Cooperative, founded in 1974, is the oldest English-speaking film co-op in Canada. It is a member-run registered charity offering equipment and facilities to aid in film making. The cooperative also runs the Halifax Independent Filmmakers Festival, which celebrated its tenth anniversary in 2016.

The Centre for Art Tapes (CFAT) is another not-for-profit organisation that facilitates artists working with electronic media including video, audio, and new media. They were located in the CBC Radio Building until it was demolished, and have since relocated to 2238 Maitland Street.

Museums

The city is overlooked by a large museum and national historic site, the Halifax Citadel not far from the province's Natural History Museum. The Maritime Museum of the Atlantic, the oldest and largest maritime museum in Canada explores the cultural and technology of the province's seafaring heritage. Moored beside the Maritime Museum is the museum ship HMCS Sackville, Canada's naval memorial. The city's rich naval history is also presented at the Naval Museum of Halifax in the city's North End. The Pier 21 Immigration Museum located a former ocean liner immigration shed features Canada's immigration history. Across the harbour, the Dartmouth Heritage Museum preserves the history of the Dartmouth side of the Harbour. The Black Cultural Centre for Nova Scotia in Cherry Brook celebrates the history and culture of African Nova Scotians. A variety of community museums across the municipality showcase community history such as the Fultz House Museum in Sackville and the Musquodoboit Railway Museum in Musquodoboit Harbour. Two aviation museums are located in Halifax; the Atlantic Aviation Museum near the Halifax International Airport and the Shearwater Aviation Museum in Eastern Passage.

Tourism
The tourism industry has had a strong influence on the region's cultural activities in recent decades and provides important spin-offs from attendance at various festivals and events throughout the retail, restaurant and accommodation sectors, particularly in the downtown urban core of the former cities of Halifax and Dartmouth. In the summer, downtown vendors and buskers cater to cruise ship passengers and tourists, while destinations such as the Public Gardens, Point Pleasant Park, Casino Nova Scotia, Citadel Hill and most-famously Peggys Cove all benefit from visitors attending cultural events.

Festivals and events
The Tall Ships came to Halifax Harbour in 1984, 2000, 2004 and 2007. Yacht races such as the biennial Marblehead to Halifax Ocean Race and the Route Halifax Saint-Pierre Ocean Race (Halifax to St. Pierre) provide additional flavour.

For more than thirty years it has hosted an international military tattoo, which in 2006 was granted the right to be known as the Royal Nova Scotia International Tattoo by HRH Queen Elizabeth II.

Important festivals include the Atlantic Jazz Festival, the Atlantic Film Festival, the Multicultural Festival, the Greek Summerfest, Halifax Pride, the Lebanese Festival, and the annual International Busker Festival.  Halifax also hosts an annual new music festival called the Halifax Pop Explosion each fall.

The Halifax Port Authority is redeveloping a waterfront area adjacent to its passenger/cruise ship terminal (which includes Pier 21) as the Halifax Seaport, promoted as a Bohemian district.

Entertainment and nightlife
Halifax is reputed to have one of the highest number of bars per capita of any Canadian city; even its QMJHL team is named after a New Brunswick beer company, Moosehead. Many bars have live music every night of the week and artists performing almost any style of music can be found. Halifax's relatively late last call (between three and four in the morning) means that many party-goers are out into the wee hours of the day. A popular destination after leaving the bars is Pizza Corner.

The Split Crow Pub is a tavern founded in 1890 and named after the oldest pub in the town, which was the first place in Nova Scotia to get a liquor licence.

Performance venues
Outdoor concerts are often performed on the Halifax Common or the slopes of Citadel Hill. Major indoor concerts most often take place at the Scotiabank Centre, a downtown arena.

Other venues include:

 Dalhousie Arts Centre at Dalhousie University is home to Symphony Nova Scotia
 Rebecca Cohn Auditorium (1,023 seats) is the largest concert hall in the province.
 Sir James Dunn Theatre (230 seats)
 Three smaller studio theatres
 Seton Auditorium (1000 seats) is an auditorium at Mount Saint Vincent University with a unique round configuration.
 Spatz Theatre (780 seats) is an auditorium at Citadel High School.
 Bella Rose Arts Centre (600 seats) is an auditorium at Halifax West High School.
 McNally Theatre (600 seats) is an auditorium at Saint Mary's University.
 Ondaatje Hall (535 seats) is one of the larger lecture halls at Dalhousie University.
 Neptune Theatre is the premier theatre company in Atlantic Canada.
 Fountain Hall (479 seats)
 Studio Theatre (163–200 seats)
 Paul O'Regan Hall (300 seats) is an auditorium at the Halifax Central Library.
 Alderney Landing (285 seats) is a convention centre, art gallery, market, and theatre facility in Downtown Dartmouth, Nova Scotia.
 The Music Room (110 seats) is noted for its excellent acoustics.
 The Halifax Pavilion is an all-ages club and operates as a venue to foster new performers and offer a stage for burgeoning bands to try out their tunes. It also hosts up-and-coming out of town bands and creates a community among indie and especially punk musicians.
 The Paragon (formerly the Marquee Club) is the place for the bigger indie acts in Halifax, in an old, run down looking commercial building in the North End. Considered one of the best live music venues in Atlantic Canada, its stage has hosted a who's who of local and Canadian music staples.
 The Khyber is an arts and performance centre on Barrington Street.
 Casino Nova Scotia has several venues for concerts and events.
 Schooner Showroom
 Compass Room
 The Harbourfront Lounge

See also
 Media in Halifax, Nova Scotia

References

External links
Tourism, Culture, Heritage Halifax
Destination Halifax
Event Halifax
Dalhousie Arts Centre (Rebecca Cohn)
Halifax Metro Centre
Neptune Theatre
Art Gallery of Nova Scotia

 
Tourist attractions in Halifax County, Nova Scotia